The Tongwe are an ethnic and linguistic group based in Kigoma District and Uvinza District of Kigoma Region, on the eastern shore of Lake Tanganyika in western Tanzania.  In 2000 the Tongwe population was estimated to number 31,551 .

Ethnic groups in Tanzania